Jules François Lecoq (born 8 October 1821 in Vire) was a French clergyman and bishop for the Roman Catholic Diocese of Luçon and for Roman Catholic Diocese of Nantes. He became ordained in 1845. He was appointed bishop in 1875. He died in 1892.

References

19th-century French Roman Catholic bishops
1821 births
1892 deaths
People from Vire
Bishops of Nantes
Bishops of Luçon